Nathaniel Marston (July 9, 1975 – November 11, 2015) was an American actor and producer. He is known for his two roles on ABC's One Life to Live as Al Holden and Dr. Michael McBain from 2001 to 2007.

Early life
Born on July 9, 1975, in Torrington, Connecticut, Marston lived in several states with his mother Elizabeth, an aspiring actress, before moving to Kauai, Hawaii, at the age of three. When he was ten, they moved to San Diego, California. During the next several years he lived in Los Angeles and New York, returning to Los Angeles where he graduated from Beverly Hills High School.

Career
While working at a Beverly Hills bakery, Marston was "discovered" by a customer who happened to be an agent for William Morris. After appearing in several commercials, he was cast as Rosario Cappamezza in the feature film Love Is All There Is co-starring with Angelina Jolie, followed by a role in the film The Craft (1996). He then became a regular in the prime time television series Matt Waters in 1996.

Marston appeared as Eddie Silva on the CBS soap opera As the World Turns from 1998 to 2000. The role earned him a Soap Opera Digest Award nomination for "Outstanding Male Newcomer." He next portrayed Al Holden on the ABC soap opera One Life to Live from 2001 to 2003, and then played Dr. Michael McBain on the series from 2004 to 2007.

Marston had a small role in the 2002 cable television movie Monday Night Mayhem. On November 25, 2008, he appeared on Law & Order: SVU in the role of Brent Latimer.
Marston's other film work includes roles in the feature films Ordinary Sinner (2001) and Ciao, America (2002), along with a leading role in the short film The Paw (2005). Marston also starred as Tony Parisi in the 2011 independently produced body-switching romantic comedy Walk a Mile in My Pradas.

Personal life
Marston was married to Rita Bias in 2006. In the early hours of October 21, 2007, he was arrested following an altercation with three people in New York City, and was thought to be under the influence of narcotics.  Ultimately, in March 2010 Marston pleaded guilty to one charge of misdemeanor resisting arrest and completed a three-month course in anger management as part of a no-jail-time sentencing deal.  No drug allegations were ever substantiated, though Marston did admit to punching a police officer who was trying to break up the fracas. Marston was involved with the charities The Gabriel Project and Lower Eastside Service Center. He was an amateur boxer.

Death
On October 30, 2015, Marston was involved in a car accident near Reno, Nevada, that left him in critical condition. He was not wearing a seatbelt when his pickup truck flipped several times, throwing him from the truck. No drugs or alcohol were found in his system.  His mother later reported that he was on life support and doctors had advised that, if he survived, he would likely be paralyzed from the neck down. Marston died on November 11, 2015, following complications from surgery.

Filmography

Film

Television

References

External links

 
 Official website
 

1975 births
2015 deaths
American male film actors
American male soap opera actors
Male actors from Connecticut
20th-century American male actors
21st-century American male actors
People from Sharon, Connecticut
Road incident deaths in Nevada